Alexander Macleay (also spelt McLeay) MLC FLS FRS  (24 June 1767 – 18 July 1848) was a leading member of the Linnean Society, a fellow of the Royal Society and member of the New South Wales Legislative Council.

Life
Macleay was born on Ross-shire, Scotland, eldest son of William Macleay, provost of Wick. Alexander had a classical education, before relocating to London and becoming a wine merchant with his business partner William Sharp – after whom his first son was named. In 1795 he was elected a fellow of the Linnean Society of London, also serving as its secretary, and was also appointed chief clerk in the prisoners of war office. When the office was linked with the Transport Board after war broke out, Macleay became head of the correspondence department and by 1806 secretary. The board was abolished in 1815, and Macleay retired on an annual pension, of £750.

Macleay's chief natural history interest was entomology, principally lepidoptery, and he possessed the finest and most extensive collection then existing of any private individual in England and possibly the world.  This included the British Collection of John Curtis now housed in Melbourne, Australia.  
In 1813, he was elected a foreign member of the Royal Swedish Academy of Sciences.

On 14 June 1825, Macleay was appointed Colonial Secretary for New South Wales. He arrived in Sydney in January 1826, with his wife Eliza, 9 of his 10 surviving children, and his extensive collection. He was soon working twelve-hour days and on 17 July 1825 was nominated to the New South Wales Legislative and Executive Councils, holding both positions until December 1836. Macleay represented Counties of Gloucester, Macquarie, and Stanley in the partially elected legislative council from June 1843 until 19 June 1848, a month before his death. Originally residing at the Colonial Secretary's House in Macquarie Place, Macleay was granted land at Elizabeth Bay by Governor Ralph Darling, where he constructed Elizabeth Bay House and laid out an extensive botanic garden.

His extensive entomological collections formed the basis of the Macleay Museum at the University of Sydney.

Macleay was also very active beyond his scientific pursuits and was the foundation president of the Australian Club.

Family
Macleay married a Miss Barclay of Urie.
He was the father of the entomologist William Sharp Macleay, who expanded his father's collection, and of George Macleay, also a zoologist.  
William John Macleay, his nephew, was also an explorer and collector in Australia and New Guinea.

His daughter Rosa Roberta married Arthur Pooley Onslow; her children included Arthur Alexander Walton Onslow and Sir Alexander Onslow. Another daughter, Christiana Susan, married William Dumaresq.

References

External links

Colonial Secretary's papers 1822-1877, State Library of Queensland- includes digitised correspondence and letters written by Macleay when he was employed as Colonial Secretary relating to matters such as the Morton Bay Penal Settlement and Norfolk Island

1767 births
1848 deaths
British entomologists
Fellows of the Royal Society
Fellows of the Linnean Society of London
Members of the Royal Swedish Academy of Sciences
Members of the New South Wales Legislative Council
Scottish emigrants to colonial Australia
Colonial Secretaries of New South Wales
19th-century Australian public servants
Presidents of the New South Wales Legislative Council
Macleay family